Saint-Vincent-sur-Oust (literally Saint-Vincent on Oust) is a commune in the Morbihan department of Brittany  in north-western France.

Geography
The river Oust forms all of the commune's northern and eastern borders; the river Arz forms most of its south-western border.

Demographics 
Inhabitants of Saint-Vincent-sur-Oust are called in French Vincentais.

See also
Communes of the Morbihan department

References

External links

 Mayors of Morbihan Association 

Saintvincentsuroust